Slap Shot 2: Breaking the Ice is a 2002 sports comedy film directed by Steve Boyum and starring Stephen Baldwin and Gary Busey. The direct-to-video film is the sequel to the 1977 film Slap Shot.

Plot 

25 years after the events of the first film, the Charlestown Chiefs are still languishing in Pennsylvania. Sean Linden, a former NHL player whose name has been disgraced for betting on games, has replaced Reggie Dunlop as the main protagonist — initially a player-coach, just like Dunlop, Linden also serves as the team's captain. The Chiefs struggle both on and off the ice, and violence remains their hallmark as Sean does not try to control the fighting trio of the Hanson Brothers.

Following another disappointing season, the team is sold to a family entertainment corporation called Better America, run by an executive named Richmond Claremont. The Chiefs are then moved to Nebraska and renamed the "Super Chiefs," and are also given a new female coach. Sean and the rest of the players soon discover that Claremont intends to use the Super Chiefs as a team which loses in scripted games against a Harlem Globetrotters-type team called the Omaha IceBreakers, in an attempt by Claremont to make the game suitable for a family audience.

During their first rehearsal, a fight breaks out between the Super Chiefs and the IceBreakers, which results in the Hanson Brothers getting fired. After the fight, Claremont bribes a financially struggling Sean to change the team's attitude about losing games on purpose, and then he can leave on his own terms. Sean manages to convince everyone into supporting "fake games" for higher pay and better exposure, and he prepares to leave Nebraska after faking a shoulder injury. While at the airport, he watches a panel discussion on TV about how he and Claremont are an embarrassment to the game of hockey. Realizing his love for the game, Sean returns to the team, along with the Hanson Brothers, to play a real game against the IceBreakers as the Chiefs.

Finally back to their old ways, the Chiefs use their physical brutality and beat the IceBreakers on a last-second goal by Sean. A furious Claremont threatens to sue, but he learns the team was sold under his nose to the Hanson Brothers, who recently won the lottery. The movie ends with the Hanson Brothers announcing the team is returning to Charlestown and going back to their roots of playing "old-time hockey."

Reception 
Rotten Tomatoes gives Slap Shot 2: Breaking the Ice a score of 0% based on 5 reviews.

References

External links 
 The Official Slap Shot 2 Website
 
 
 
 The Official Home of the Hanson Bros.

2002 direct-to-video films
2002 films
American ice hockey films
2000s sports comedy films
Direct-to-video sequel films
Universal Pictures direct-to-video films
Films set in Nebraska
Films shot in Vancouver
Films directed by Steve Boyum
Films scored by John Frizzell (composer)
American sports comedy films
American direct-to-video films
2000s English-language films
2000s American films